The Mexican Episcopal Conference is an organization of Catholic bishops, known as an episcopal conference. It is the official leadership body of the Catholic Church in Mexico.

Organization
The organization is governed by the Presidency Council, consisting of:
 Card. Francisco Robles Ortega, Archbishop of Guadalajara, Jalisco.
 Vice President: Mons. Javier Navarro Rodríguez, Bishop of Zamora
 Secretary General: Bishop Alfonso Gerardo Miranda Guardiola, Auxiliary Bishop of Monterrey.
 General Treasurer: Mons. Ramon Castro Castro, Bishop of Cuernavaca
 Members: Mons. Oscar Roberto Dominguez Couttolenc, Mgr. Sigifredo Noriega Barceló, Mons. Carlos Garfias Merlos.

Members
The members of the CEM are all Diocesan Archbishops and Bishops, Eastern Rite Bishops, Diocesan Administrators and all those entitled to Diocesan Bishops, Coadjutors and Auxiliary Bishops and titular Bishops who carry out their functions within the Mexican territory, including the Apostolic Nuncio.

Currently, the bishops belonging to the CEM are classified as follows:

 6 Cardinals (4 archbishops and 2 emeriti)
 16 residential archbishops
 66 bishops (residential and prelates)
 31 auxiliary bishops
 39 bishops emeriti (8 archbishops and 31 bishops)
 1 bishop of the Maronite eparchy
 1 Administrator of the Greek Melkite eparchy
 1 Apostolic Nuncio

External links
Official website of the Mexican Episcopal Conference

Mexico
Catholic Church in Mexico